The mesquite mouse (Peromyscus merriami) is a species of rodent in the family Cricetidae found in Mexico and in Arizona in the United States.

References

Musser, G. G. and M. D. Carleton. 2005. Superfamily Muroidea. pp. 894–1531 in Mammal Species of the World a Taxonomic and Geographic Reference. D. E. Wilson and D. M. Reeder eds. Johns Hopkins University Press, Baltimore.

Peromyscus
Fauna of the Sonoran Desert
Mouse, mesquite
Mouse, mesquite
Mouse, mesquite
Natural history of Arizona
Natural history of Sonora
Mammals described in 1896
Taxonomy articles created by Polbot